The 2020–21 Georgetown Hoyas men's basketball team represented Georgetown University in the 2020–21 NCAA Division I men's basketball season. The Hoyas, led by fourth-year head coach Patrick Ewing, were members of the Big East Conference. Although the Hoyas normally play their home games at the Capital One Arena in Washington, D.C., public-health restrictions due to the ongoing COVID-19 pandemic forced Georgetown to play its home games on campus at McDonough Gymnasium without fans.

UConn (Connecticut) joined the Big East Conference this season. Like Georgetown a founding member of the original Big East Conference of 1979–2013, UConn had remained behind in the old conference — which renamed itself the American Athletic Conference, marketed as "The American" — when Georgetown and six other schools left it to form the new Big East Conference in 2013. Georgetown and UConn had played only twice since then, in non-conference games in 2016 and 2017, but UConn's move to the Big East allowed the conference rivalry between the schools to resume in 2020–2021.

UConn's move to the Big East also expanded the Big East regular season. Beginning in 2020–2021, each Big East team was scheduled to play 20 regular-season conference games rather than the 18 they had played each year from the 2013–2014 through 2019–2020 seasons. However, the cancellation of some games during 2020-2021 due to COVID-19 issues resulted in only two teams playing their full slate of 20 games. The Hoyas played only 16 conference games during the 2020–2021 season.

Despite having nine new players and a preseason consensus that they would finish at the bottom of the Big East, the Hoyas had an unexpectedly successful season. They finished in eighth place in the Big East during the regular season, then won the 2021 Big East men's basketball tournament — their first Big East championship since 2007 —  to earn an automatic bid to the 2021 NCAA Division I men's basketball tournament, their first appearance in the tournament since 2015. They lost in the first round to Colorado.

Previous season
The Hoyas finished the 2019–20 season at 15–17, 5–13 in Big East play, and tied for eighth place in the conference. As the No. 8 seed in the Big East tournament, they lost in the first round to St. John's. The following day, the remainder of the Big East tournament and all other NCAA postseason play was canceled because of the COVID-19 pandemic. Georgetown finished the season with an overall losing record for the third time in five years and with a 5–13 conference record for the third time in four years.

Offseason

Departures

Incoming transfers

2020 recruiting class

Roster

Notes: (1) On December 18, Georgetown announced that Jalen Harris was taking a leave of absence from the team for "family reasons;" he did not return. (2) Chuma Azinge was a "recruited walk-on."

Schedule and results

|-
!colspan=9 style=| Regular season

|-
!colspan=9 style="|Big East tournament

|-
!colspan=9 style="|NCAA tournament

Notes

References

Georgetown Hoyas
Georgetown Hoyas men's basketball seasons
Georgetown Hoyas men's basketball team
Georgetown Hoyas men's basketball team
Georgetown